The 2016 season was the Minnesota Vikings' 56th in the National Football League and their third under head coach Mike Zimmer. After starting the season with five consecutive wins prior to their bye week, the Vikings managed just three victories after the bye and were eliminated from playoff contention in Week 16 with a 38–25 road loss to the Packers. They joined the 1978 Redskins, 1993 Saints, 2003 Vikings, 2009 Broncos, 2009 Giants and 2015 Falcons in missing the playoffs after starting 5–0 or better. The Vikings are the only NFL team to have more than once started 5–0 or better and missed the playoffs.

The team's new stadium, U.S. Bank Stadium in Minneapolis, opened at the start of the season, with a regular season debut victory on September 18 against division rival Green Bay on NBC Sunday Night Football. It was built on the site of the Hubert H. Humphrey Metrodome, the team's home from 1982 through 2013. The Vikings played at the outdoor TCF Bank Stadium at the University of Minnesota in 2014 and 2015.

On August 30, starting quarterback Teddy Bridgewater suffered a season-ending ACL tear and dislocated knee on a non-contact play during team practice. Originally, it was reported that Bridgewater's injury would keep him out for around a year and a half, and on January 27, 2017, it was reported that it was possible he could also miss the entire 2017 season. The extent of Bridgewater's injury prompted the Vikings to make a trade with the Philadelphia Eagles for former number 1 draft pick Sam Bradford, giving up a first-round pick in the 2017 NFL Draft and a conditional fourth-round pick in the 2018 Draft in exchange. Adrian Peterson's season was also hit by injury after he tore the meniscus in his right knee in the home opener against the Packers. On September 22, Peterson underwent successful surgery to repair the meniscus. It was also revealed that the knee had a mild LCL sprain, but it did not need surgery. He was placed on injured reserve on September 23, 2016, and reactivated on December 17, but only made six rushing attempts before leaving the game, ending his season. Peterson left the team at the end of the season, ending his 10-year tenure with the Vikings.

Offseason

Draft

Draft trades

Roster changes

Preseason

Schedule
The Vikings' preseason opponents and schedule were announced on April 7, 2016.

Game summaries

Week 1: at Cincinnati Bengals

Week 2: at Seattle Seahawks

Week 3: vs. San Diego Chargers

Week 4: vs. Los Angeles Rams

Regular season

Schedule

Note: Intra-division opponents are in bold text.

Game summaries

Week 1: at Tennessee Titans

Shaun Hill started at quarterback in the team's first game, as Sam Bradford was rested until the second game.

Week 2: vs. Green Bay Packers

Sam Bradford made his first start for the Vikings in week 2 against the Packers just 15 days after being traded. Despite not having much time to learn the offense, Bradford outplayed Aaron Rodgers but ended up hurting his left hand in the first half due to a hit by Clay Matthews. Bradford finished the game completing 22-of-31 passes for 286 yards and two touchdowns, helping lead the Vikings to their first win in their new stadium.

Week 3: at Carolina Panthers

Week 4: vs. New York Giants

Week 5: vs. Houston Texans

Week 7: at Philadelphia Eagles

Sam Bradford faces his former team for the first time after he was traded from the Eagles prior to the start of the season. The Vikings streak came to a halt as they lost the game 21-10.

Week 8: at Chicago Bears

Week 9: vs. Detroit Lions

Although it was Stefon Diggs' big day, having caught 13 passes for 80 yards, it wasn't enough as the Vikings dropped 5-3.

Week 10: at Washington Redskins

This was the last game for Blair Walsh in a Vikings uniform as he was released days after this game.

Week 11: vs. Arizona Cardinals

Week 12: at Detroit Lions
NFL on Thanksgiving Day

Week 13: vs. Dallas Cowboys

Head coach Mike Zimmer missed this game after undergoing emergency eye surgery the night before. Special teams coordinator Mike Priefer served as interim coach for the game.

Week 14: at Jacksonville Jaguars

Week 15: vs. Indianapolis Colts

Adrian Peterson returned to action and had six carries for 22 yards against the Colts. This was the last game he'd ever play for the Vikings.

Week 16: at Green Bay Packers

With the loss, the Vikings dropped to 7–8 and were officially eliminated from postseason contention. The loss also made the Vikings the first team to twice start 5–0 or better, and on both occasions miss the playoffs (they also missed the playoffs in 2003 after starting 6–0).

Week 17: vs. Chicago Bears

Standings

Division

Conference

Staff

Pro Bowl
Five Vikings were selected for the 2017 Pro Bowl: defensive end Everson Griffen, defensive tackle Linval Joseph, return specialist Cordarrelle Patterson, cornerback Xavier Rhodes and free safety Harrison Smith. Rhodes played in his first Pro Bowl, while Griffen, Patterson and Smith participated in their second; Patterson was the first return specialist in Vikings history to go to two Pro Bowls.
Linval Joseph replaced Rams defensive tackle Aaron Donald.

Roster

Statistics

Team leaders

Source: Minnesota Vikings' official website

League rankings

Source: NFL.com.

References

2016 National Football League season by team
2016
2016 in sports in Minnesota